Cicindela pugetana, the sagebrush tiger beetle, is a species of flashy tiger beetle in the family Carabidae. It is found in North America.

References

Further reading

 
 

pugetana
Articles created by Qbugbot
Beetles described in 1914